Speiredonia darwiniana is a species of moth of the family Erebidae first described by Alberto Zilli in 2010. It is found in north-western Australia, where it has been recorded from Western Australia and the Northern Territory.

The wingspan is 68–73 mm. The ground colour of the wings is chocolate brown, mottled with paler and darker areas and bluish reflections in the antemarginal field and towards the anal margin of both the forewings and hindwings.

References

Moths described in 2010
Speiredonia
Moths of Australia